The Russian Revolution was a period of political and social revolution that took place in the former Russian Empire, begun during the First World War. This period saw Russia abolish its monarchy and adopt a socialist form of government following two successive revolutions and a bloody civil war. The Russian Revolution can also be seen as the precursor for the other European revolutions that occurred during or in the aftermath of WWI, such as the German Revolution of 1918. 

The Russian Revolution was inaugurated with the February Revolution in 1917. This first revolt focused in and around the then-capital Petrograd (now Saint Petersburg). After major military losses during the war, the Russian Army had begun to mutiny. Army leaders and high ranking officials were convinced that if Tsar Nicholas II abdicated, the domestic unrest would subside. Nicholas agreed and stepped down, ushering in a new government led by the Russian Duma (parliament) which became the Russian Provisional Government. This government was dominated by the interests of prominent capitalists, as well as the Russian nobility and aristocracy. 

In response to these developments, grassroots community assemblies (called Soviets) were formed. These Soviets were led by soldiers and urban industrial proletarians, as well as rural farmers. The Soviets initially permitted the new Provisional Government to rule, however the Soviets did insist on a prerogative (privilege) in order to influence the government and to control various militias. By March, Russia was locked in a dual power as neither government trusted the other. The Provisional Government held state power in areas such as military and international affairs, whereas the network of Soviets held more power concerning domestic affairs. Critically, the Soviets held the allegiance of the working-class, as well as the growing urban middle-class.

During this chaotic period, there were frequent mutinies, protests and strikes. Many socialist and other leftist political organizations were engaged in daily struggle and vied for influence within the Provisional Government and the Soviets. Notable factions include the Social-Democrats or Mensheviks, the Social Revolutionaries, and the Anarchists. These organizations competed with the Bolsheviks ("Ones of the Majority"), a far-left party led by Vladimir Lenin, for political power and popular influence. Initially the Bolsheviks were a marginalized faction, however that changed following a series of developments including the use of their slogan, peace, land, and bread which promised to cease war with Germany, give land to the peasantry, and end the famine caused by Russia's involvement in WWI. These slogans had a direct effect on the growing Bolshevik popularity. Despite the virtual universal disdain towards the war effort, the Provisional Government chose to continue fighting anyway, giving the Bolsheviks and other socialist factions a justification to advance the revolution further. The Bolsheviks merged various workers' militias loyal to them into Red Guards, which would be capable of revolution.

The volatile situation in Russia reached its climax with the October Revolution, which was a Bolshevik armed insurrection by workers and soldiers in Petrograd that successfully overthrew the Provisional Government, transferring all its authority to the Bolsheviks. Under pressure from German military offensives, the Bolsheviks soon relocated the national capital to Moscow. The Bolsheviks which by now had secured a strong base of support within the Soviets and, as the supreme governing party, established their own government, the Russian Soviet Federative Socialist Republic (RSFSR). The RSFSR began the process of reorganizing the former empire into the world's first socialist state, to practice soviet democracy on a national and international scale. Their promise to end Russia's participation in the First World War was fulfilled when the Bolshevik leaders signed the Treaty of Brest-Litovsk with Germany in March 1918. To further secure the new state, the Bolsheviks established the Cheka, a secret police that functioned as a revolutionary security service to weed out, execute, or punish those considered to be "enemies of the people" in campaigns called the Red Terror, consciously modeled on those of the French Revolution.

Although the Bolsheviks held large support in urban areas, they had many enemies both foreign and domestic that refused to recognize their government. As a result, Russia erupted into a bloody civil war, which pitted the "Reds" (Bolsheviks), against the enemies of the Bolshevik regime collectively called the White Army. The White Army consisted of: independence movements, monarchists, liberals, and anti-Bolshevik socialist parties. In response, Leon Trotsky began ordering workers' militias loyal to the Bolsheviks to begin merging and formed the Red Army. While many notable historical events occurred in Moscow and Petrograd, there were also major changes in cities throughout the state, and among national minorities throughout the empire and in the rural areas, where peasants took over and redistributed land. 

As the war progressed, the RSFSR began establishing Soviet power in the newly independent republics that seceded from the Russian Empire. The RSFSR initially focused its efforts on the newly independent republics of Armenia, Azerbaijan, Belarus, Georgia, and Ukraine. Wartime cohesion and intervention from foreign powers prompted the RSFSR to begin unifying these nations under one flag and created the Union of Soviet Socialist Republics (USSR). Historians generally consider the end of the revolutionary period to be in 1923 when the Russian Civil War concluded with the defeat of the White Army and all rival socialist factions. The victorious Bolshevik Party reconstituted itself into the Communist Party of the Soviet Union and would remain in power for over six decades.

Background

The Russian Revolution of 1905 was a major factor contributing to the cause of the Revolutions of 1917. The events of Bloody Sunday triggered nationwide protests and soldier mutinies. A council of workers called the St. Petersburg Soviet was created in this chaos. While the 1905 Revolution was ultimately crushed, and the leaders of the St. Petersburg Soviet were arrested, this laid the groundwork for the later Petrograd Soviet and other revolutionary movements during the lead up to 1917. The 1905 Revolution also led to the creation of a Duma (parliament), that would later form the Provisional Government following February 1917.

Russia's poor performance in 1914-1915 prompted growing complaints directed at Tsar Nicholas II and the Romanov family. A short wave of patriotic nationalism ended in the face of defeats and poor conditions on the Eastern Front of World War I. The Tsar made the situation worse by taking personal control of the Imperial Russian Army in 1915, a challenge far beyond his skills. He was now held personally responsible for Russia's continuing defeats and losses. In addition, Tsarina Alexandra, left to rule in while the Tsar commanded at the front, was German born, leading to suspicion of collusion, only to be exacerbated by rumors relating to her relationship with the controversial mystic Grigori Rasputin. Rasputin's influence led to disastrous ministerial appointments and corruption, resulting in a worsening of conditions within Russia.

After the entry of the Ottoman Empire on the side of the Central Powers in October 1914, Russia was deprived of a major trade route to the Mediterranean Sea, which worsened the economic crisis and the munitions shortages. Meanwhile, Germany was able to produce great amounts of munitions whilst constantly fighting on two major battlefronts.

The conditions during the war resulted in a devastating loss of morale within the Russian army and the general population of Russia itself. This was particularly apparent in the cities, owing to a lack of food in response to the disruption of agriculture. Food scarcity had become a considerable problem in Russia, but the cause of this did not lie in any failure of the harvests, which had not been significantly altered during wartime. The indirect reason was that the government, in order to finance the war, printed millions of rouble notes, and by 1917, inflation had made prices increase up to four times what they had been in 1914. Farmers were consequently faced with a higher cost of living, but with little increase in income. As a result, they tended to hoard their grain and to revert to subsistence farming. Thus the cities were constantly short of food. At the same time, rising prices led to demands for higher wages in the factories, and in January and February 1916, revolutionary propaganda, in part aided by German funds, led to widespread strikes. This resulted in a growing criticism of the government, including an increased participation of workers in revolutionary parties.

Liberal parties too had an increased platform to voice their complaints, as the initial fervor of the war resulted in the Tsarist government creating a variety of political organizations. In July 1915, a Central War Industries Committee was established under the chairmanship of a prominent Octobrist, Alexander Guchkov (1862–1936), including ten workers' representatives. The Petrograd Mensheviks agreed to join despite the objections of their leaders abroad. All this activity gave renewed encouragement to political ambitions, and in September 1915, a combination of Octobrists and Kadets in the Duma demanded the forming of a responsible government, which the Tsar rejected.

All these factors had given rise to a sharp loss of confidence in the regime, even within the ruling class, growing throughout the war. Early in 1916, Guchkov discussed with senior army officers and members of the Central War Industries Committee about a possible coup to force the abdication of the Tsar. In December, a small group of nobles assassinated Rasputin, and in January 1917 the Tsar's cousin, Grand Duke Nicholas, was asked indirectly by Prince Lvov whether he would be prepared to take over the throne from his nephew, Tsar Nicholas II. None of these incidents were in themselves the immediate cause of the February Revolution, but they do help to explain why the monarchy survived only a few days after it had broken out.

Meanwhile, Socialist Revolutionary leaders in exile, many of them living in Switzerland, had been the glum spectators of the collapse of international socialist solidarity. French and German Social Democrats had voted in favour of their respective governments' war efforts. Georgi Plekhanov in Paris had adopted a violently anti-German stand, while Alexander Parvus supported the German war effort as the best means of ensuring a revolution in Russia. The Mensheviks largely maintained that Russia had the right to defend herself against Germany, although Julius Martov (a prominent Menshevik), now on the left of his group, demanded an end to the war and a settlement on the basis of national self-determination, with no annexations or indemnities.

It was these views of Martov that predominated in a manifesto drawn up by Leon Trotsky (at the time a Menshevik) at a conference in Zimmerwald, attended by 35 Socialist leaders in September 1915. Inevitably Vladimir Lenin, supported by Zinoviev and Radek, strongly contested them. Their attitudes became known as the Zimmerwald Left. Lenin rejected both the defence of Russia and the cry for peace. Since the autumn of 1914, he had insisted that "from the standpoint of the working class and of the labouring masses the lesser evil would be the defeat of the Tsarist Monarchy"; the war must be turned into a civil war of the proletarian soldiers against their own governments, and if a proletarian victory should emerge from this in Russia, then their duty would be to wage a revolutionary war for the liberation of the masses throughout Europe.

Economic and social changes

An elementary theory of property, believed by many peasants, was that land should belong to those who work on it. At the same time, peasant life and culture was changing constantly. Change was facilitated by the physical movement of growing numbers of peasant villagers who migrated to and from industrial and urban environments, but also by the introduction of city culture into the village through material goods, the press, and word of mouth.

Workers also had good reasons for discontent: overcrowded housing with often deplorable sanitary conditions, long hours at work (on the eve of the war, a 10-hour workday six days a week was the average and many were working 11–12 hours a day by 1916), constant risk of injury and death from poor safety and sanitary conditions, harsh discipline (not only rules and fines, but foremen's fists), and inadequate wages (made worse after 1914 by steep wartime increases in the cost of living). At the same time, urban industrial life had its benefits, though these could be just as dangerous (in terms of social and political stability) as the hardships. There were many encouragements to expect more from life. Acquiring new skills gave many workers a sense of self-respect and confidence, heightening expectations and desires. Living in cities, workers encountered material goods they had never seen in villages. Most importantly, workers living in cities were exposed to new ideas about the social and political order.

The social causes of the Russian Revolution can be derived from centuries of oppression of the lower classes by the Tsarist regime and Nicholas's failures in World War I. While rural agrarian peasants had been emancipated from serfdom in 1861, they still resented paying redemption payments to the state, and demanded communal tender of the land they worked. The problem was further compounded by the failure of Sergei Witte's land reforms of the early 20th century. Increasing peasant disturbances and sometimes actual revolts occurred, with the goal of securing ownership of the land they worked. Russia consisted mainly of poor farming peasants and substantial inequality of land ownership, with 1.5% of the population owning 25% of the land.

The rapid industrialization of Russia also resulted in urban overcrowding and poor conditions for urban industrial workers (as mentioned above). Between 1890 and 1910, the population of the capital, Saint Petersburg, swelled from 1,033,600 to 1,905,600, with Moscow experiencing similar growth. This created a new 'proletariat' which, due to being crowded together in the cities, was much more likely to protest and go on strike than the peasantry had been in previous times. In one 1904 survey, it was found that an average of 16 people shared each apartment in Saint Petersburg, with six people per room. There was also no running water, and piles of human waste were a threat to the health of the workers. The poor conditions only aggravated the situation, with the number of strikes and incidents of public disorder rapidly increasing in the years shortly before World War I. Because of late industrialization, Russia's workers were highly concentrated. By 1914, 40% of Russian workers were employed in factories of 1,000+ workers (32% in 1901). 42% worked in 100–1,000 worker enterprises, 18% in 1–100 worker businesses (in the US, 1914, the figures were 18, 47 and 35 respectively).

World War I added to the chaos. Conscription across Russia resulted in unwilling citizens being sent off to war. The vast demand for factory production of war supplies and workers resulted in many more labor riots and strikes. Conscription stripped skilled workers from the cities, who had to be replaced with unskilled peasants. When famine began to hit due to the poor railway system, workers abandoned the cities in droves seeking food. Finally, the soldiers themselves, who suffered from a lack of equipment and protection from the elements, began to turn against the Tsar. This was mainly because, as the war progressed, many of the officers who were loyal to the Tsar were killed, being replaced by discontented conscripts from the major cities who had little loyalty to the Tsar.

Political issues

Many sections of the country had reason to be dissatisfied with the existing autocracy. Nicholas II was a deeply conservative ruler and maintained a strict authoritarian system. Individuals and society in general were expected to show self-restraint, devotion to community, deference to the social hierarchy and a sense of duty to the country. Religious faith helped bind all of these tenets together as a source of comfort and reassurance in the face of difficult conditions and as a means of political authority exercised through the clergy. Perhaps more than any other modern monarch, Nicholas II attached his fate and the future of his dynasty to the notion of the ruler as a saintly and infallible father to his people.

This vision of the Romanov monarchy left him unaware of the state of his country. With a firm belief that his power to rule was granted by Divine Right, Nicholas assumed that the Russian people were devoted to him with unquestioning loyalty. This ironclad belief rendered Nicholas unwilling to allow the progressive reforms that might have alleviated the suffering of the Russian people. Even after the 1905 Revolution spurred the Tsar to decree limited civil rights and democratic representation, he worked to limit even these liberties in order to preserve the ultimate authority of the crown.

Despite constant oppression, the desire of the people for democratic participation in government decisions was strong. Since the Age of Enlightenment, Russian intellectuals had promoted Enlightenment ideals such as the dignity of the individual and the rectitude of democratic representation. These ideals were championed most vociferously by Russia's liberals, although populists, Marxists, and anarchists also claimed to support democratic reforms. A growing opposition movement had begun to challenge the Romanov monarchy openly well before the turmoil of World War I.

Dissatisfaction with Russian autocracy culminated in the huge national upheaval that followed the Bloody Sunday massacre of January 1905, in which hundreds of unarmed protesters were shot by the Tsar's troops. Workers responded to the massacre with a crippling general strike, forcing Nicholas to put forth the October Manifesto, which established a democratically elected parliament (the State Duma). Although the Tsar accepted the 1906 Fundamental State Laws one year later, he subsequently dismissed the first two Dumas when they proved uncooperative. Unfulfilled hopes of democracy fueled revolutionary ideas and violent outbursts targeted at the monarchy.

One of the Tsar's principal rationales for risking war in 1914 was his desire to restore the prestige that Russia had lost amid the debacles of the Russo-Japanese War (1904-1905). Nicholas also sought to foster a greater sense of national unity with a war against a common and old enemy. The Russian Empire was an agglomeration of diverse ethnicities that had demonstrated significant signs of disunity in the years before the First World War. Nicholas believed in part that the shared peril and tribulation of a foreign war would mitigate the social unrest over the persistent issues of poverty, inequality, and inhumane working conditions. Instead of restoring Russia's political and military standing, World War I led to the slaughter of Russian troops and military defeats that undermined both the monarchy and Russian society to the point of collapse.

World War I

The outbreak of war in August 1914 initially served to quiet the prevalent social and political protests, focusing hostilities against a common external enemy, but this patriotic unity did not last long. As the war dragged on inconclusively, war-weariness gradually took its toll. Although many ordinary Russians joined anti-German demonstrations in the first few weeks of the war, hostility toward the Kaiser and the desire to defend their land and their lives did not necessarily translate into enthusiasm for the Tsar or the government.

Russia's first major battle of the war was a disaster; in the 1914 Battle of Tannenberg, over 30,000 Russian troops were killed or wounded and 90,000 captured, while Germany suffered just 12,000 casualties. However, Austro-Hungarian forces allied to Germany were driven back deep into the Galicia region by the end of the year. In the autumn of 1915, Nicholas had taken direct command of the army, personally overseeing Russia's main theatre of war and leaving his ambitious but incapable wife Alexandra in charge of the government. Reports of corruption and incompetence in the Imperial government began to emerge, and the growing influence of Grigori Rasputin in the Imperial family was widely resented.

In 1915, things took a critical turn for the worse when Germany shifted its focus of attack to the Eastern Front. The superior German Army – better led, better trained, and better supplied – was quite effective against the ill-equipped Russian forces, driving the Russians out of Galicia, as well as Russian Poland during the Gorlice–Tarnów Offensive campaign. By the end of October 1916, Russia had lost between 1,600,000 and 1,800,000 soldiers, with an additional 2,000,000 prisoners of war and 1,000,000 missing, all making up a total of nearly 5,000,000 men.

These staggering losses played a definite role in the mutinies and revolts that began to occur. In 1916, reports of fraternizing with the enemy began to circulate. Soldiers went hungry, lacked shoes, munitions, and even weapons. Rampant discontent lowered morale, which was further undermined by a series of military defeats.

Casualty rates were the most vivid sign of this disaster. By the end of 1914, only five months into the war, around 390,000 Russian men had lost their lives and nearly 1,000,000 were injured. Far sooner than expected, inadequately trained recruits were called for active duty, a process repeated throughout the war as staggering losses continued to mount. The officer class also saw remarkable changes, especially within the lower echelons, which were quickly filled with soldiers rising up through the ranks. These men, usually of peasant or working-class backgrounds, were to play a large role in the politicization of the troops in 1917.

The army quickly ran short of rifles and ammunition (as well as uniforms and food), and by mid-1915, men were being sent to the front bearing no arms. It was hoped that they could equip themselves with arms recovered from fallen soldiers, of both sides, on the battlefields. The soldiers did not feel as if they were valuable, rather they felt as if they were expendable.

By the spring of 1915, the army was in steady retreat, which was not always orderly; desertion, plundering, and chaotic flight were not uncommon. By 1916, however, the situation had improved in many respects. Russian troops stopped retreating, and there were even some modest successes in the offensives that were staged that year, albeit at great loss of life. Also, the problem of shortages was largely solved by a major effort to increase domestic production. Nevertheless, by the end of 1916, morale among soldiers was even worse than it had been during the great retreat of 1915. The fortunes of war may have improved, but the fact of war remained which continually took Russian lives. The crisis in morale (as was argued by Allan Wildman, a leading historian of the Russian army in war and revolution) "was rooted fundamentally in the feeling of utter despair that the slaughter would ever end and that anything resembling victory could be achieved."

The war did not only devastate soldiers. By the end of 1915, there were manifold signs that the economy was breaking down under the heightened strain of wartime demand. The main problems were food shortages and rising prices. Inflation dragged incomes down at an alarmingly rapid rate, and shortages made it difficult for an individual to sustain oneself. These shortages were a problem especially in the capital, St. Petersburg, where distance from supplies and poor transportation networks made matters particularly worse. Shops closed early or entirely for lack of bread, sugar, meat, and other provisions, and lines lengthened massively for what remained. Conditions became increasingly difficult to afford food and physically obtain it.

Strikes increased steadily from the middle of 1915, and so did crime, but, for the most part, people suffered and endured, scouring the city for food. Working-class women in St. Petersburg reportedly spent about forty hours a week in food lines, begging, turning to prostitution or crime, tearing down wooden fences to keep stoves heated for warmth, and continued to resent the rich.

Government officials responsible for public order worried about how long people's patience would last. A report by the St. Petersburg branch of the security police, the Okhrana, in October 1916, warned bluntly of "the possibility in the near future of riots by the lower classes of the empire enraged by the burdens of daily existence."

Tsar Nicholas was blamed for all of these crises, and what little support he had left began to crumble. As discontent grew, the State Duma issued a warning to Nicholas in November 1916, stating that, inevitably, a terrible disaster would grip the country unless a constitutional form of government was put in place. Nicholas ignored these warnings and Russia's Tsarist regime collapsed a few months later during the February Revolution of 1917. One year later, the Tsar and his entire family were executed.

February Revolution 

At the beginning of February, Petrograd workers began several strikes and demonstrations. On , workers at Putilov, Petrograd's largest industrial plant was closed by a strike. The next day, a series of meetings and rallies were held for International Women's Day, which gradually turned into economic and political gatherings. Demonstrations were organised to demand bread, and these were supported by the industrial working force who considered them a reason for continuing the strikes. The women workers marched to nearby factories bringing out over 50,000 workers on strike. By , virtually every industrial enterprise in Petrograd had been shut down, together with many commercial and service enterprises. Students, white-collar workers, and teachers joined the workers in the streets and at public meetings.

To quell the riots, the Tsar looked to the army. At least 180,000 troops were available in the capital, but most were either untrained or injured. Historian Ian Beckett suggests around 12,000 could be regarded as reliable, but even these proved reluctant to move in on the crowd, since it included so many women. Although few actively joined the rioting, many officers were either shot or went into hiding; the ability of the garrison to hold back the protests was all but nullified, symbols of the Tsarist regime were rapidly torn down around the city, and governmental authority in the capital collapsed – not helped by the fact that Nicholas had prorogued the Duma that morning, leaving it with no legal authority to act. The response of the Duma, urged on by the liberal bloc, was to establish a Temporary Committee to restore law and order; meanwhile, the socialist parties established the Petrograd Soviet to represent workers and soldiers. The remaining loyal units switched allegiance the next day.

When the Tsar finally arrived at in Pskov, the Army Chief Nikolai Ruzsky, and the Duma deputies Alexander Guchkov and Vasily Shulgin  suggested in unison that he abdicate the throne. Nicholas nominated his brother, the Grand Duke Michael Alexandrovich, to succeed him. Six days later, Nicholas, no longer Tsar and addressed with contempt by the sentries as "Nicholas Romanov", was reunited with his family at the Alexander Palace at Tsarskoye Selo. He was placed under house arrest with his family by the Provisional Government.

The immediate effect of the February Revolution was a widespread atmosphere of elation and excitement in Petrograd. On , a provisional government was announced. The center-left was well represented, and the government was initially chaired by a liberal aristocrat, Prince Georgy Yevgenievich Lvov, a member of the Constitutional Democratic Party (KD). The socialists had formed their rival body, the Petrograd Soviet (or workers' council) four days earlier. The Petrograd Soviet and the Provisional Government competed for power over Russia.

Dvoyevlastiye

The effective power of the Provisional Government was challenged by the authority of an institution that claimed to represent the will of workers and soldiers and could, in fact, mobilize and control these groups during the early months of the revolution – the Petrograd Soviet Council of Workers' Deputies. The model for the Soviets were workers' councils that had been established in scores of Russian cities during the 1905 Revolution. In February 1917, striking workers elected deputies to represent them and socialist activists began organizing a citywide council to unite these deputies with representatives of the socialist parties. On 27 February, socialist Duma deputies, mainly Mensheviks and Socialist Revolutionaries, took the lead in organizing a citywide council. The Petrograd Soviet met in the Tauride Palace, the same building where the new government was taking shape.

The leaders of the Petrograd Soviet believed that they represented particular classes of the population, not the whole nation. They also believed Russia was not ready for socialism. They viewed their role as limited to pressuring hesitant "bourgeoisie" to rule and to introduce extensive democratic reforms in Russia (the replacement of the monarchy by a republic, guaranteed civil rights, a democratic police and army, abolition of religious and ethnic discrimination, preparation of elections to a constituent assembly, and so on). They met in the same building as the emerging Provisional Government not to compete with the Duma Committee for state power, but to best exert pressure on the new government, to act, in other words, as a popular democratic lobby.

The relationship between these two major powers was complex from the beginning and would shape the politics of 1917. The representatives of the Provisional Government agreed to "take into account the opinions of the Soviet of Workers' Deputies", though they were also determined to prevent interference which would create an unacceptable situation of dual power.  In fact, this was precisely what was being created, though this "dual power" (dvoyevlastiye) was the result less of the actions or attitudes of the leaders of these two institutions than of actions outside their control, especially the ongoing social movement taking place on the streets of Russia's cities, factories, shops, barracks, villages, and in the trenches.

A series of political crises – see the chronology below – in the relationship between population and government and between the Provisional Government and the Soviets (which developed into a nationwide movement with a national leadership). The All-Russian Central Executive Committee of Soviets (VTsIK) undermined the authority of the Provisional Government but also of the moderate socialist leaders of the Soviets. Although the Soviet leadership initially refused to participate in the "bourgeois" Provisional Government, Alexander Kerensky, a young, popular lawyer and a member of the Socialist Revolutionary Party (SRP), agreed to join the new cabinet, and became an increasingly central figure in the government, eventually taking leadership of the Provisional Government. As minister of war and later Prime Minister, Kerensky promoted freedom of speech, released thousands of political prisoners, continued the war effort, even organizing another offensive (which, however, was no more successful than its predecessors). Nevertheless, Kerensky still faced several great challenges, highlighted by the soldiers, urban workers, and peasants, who claimed that they had gained nothing by the revolution:
 Other political groups were trying to undermine him.
 Heavy military losses were being suffered on the front.
 The soldiers were dissatisfied and demoralised and had started to defect. (On arrival back in Russia, these soldiers were either imprisoned or sent straight back into the front.)
 There was enormous discontent with Russia's involvement in the war, and many were calling for an end to it.
 There were great shortages of food and supplies, which was difficult to remedy because of the wartime economic conditions.

The political group that proved most troublesome for Kerensky, and would eventually overthrow him, was the Bolshevik Party, led by Vladimir Lenin. Lenin had been living in exile in neutral Switzerland and, due to democratization of politics after the February Revolution, which legalized formerly banned political parties, he perceived the opportunity for his Marxist revolution. Although return to Russia had become a possibility, the war made it logistically difficult. Eventually, German officials arranged for Lenin to pass through their territory, hoping that his activities would weaken Russia or even – if the Bolsheviks came to power – lead to Russia's withdrawal from the war. Lenin and his associates, however, had to agree to travel to Russia in a sealed train: Germany would not take the chance that he would foment revolution in Germany. After passing through the front, he arrived in Petrograd in April 1917.

On the way to Russia, Lenin prepared the April Theses, which outlined central Bolshevik policies. These included that the Soviets take power (as seen in the slogan "all power to the Soviets") and denouncing the liberals and social revolutionaries in the Provisional Government, forbidding co-operation with it. Many Bolsheviks, however, had supported the Provisional Government, including Lev Kamenev.

With Lenin's arrival, the popularity of the Bolsheviks increased steadily. Over the course of the spring, public dissatisfaction with the Provisional Government and the war, in particular among workers, soldiers and peasants, pushed these groups to radical parties. Despite growing support for the Bolsheviks, buoyed by maxims that called most famously for "all power to the Soviets", the party held very little real power in the moderate-dominated Petrograd Soviet. In fact, historians such as Sheila Fitzpatrick have asserted that Lenin's exhortations for the Soviet Council to take power were intended to arouse indignation both with the Provisional Government, whose policies were viewed as conservative, and the Soviets themselves, which were viewed as subservients to the conservative government. By some other historians' accounts, Lenin and his followers were unprepared for how their groundswell of support, especially among influential worker and soldier groups, would translate into real power in the summer of 1917.

On 18 June, the Provisional Government launched an attack against Germany that failed miserably. Soon after, the government ordered soldiers to go to the front, reneging on a promise. The soldiers refused to follow the new orders. The arrival of radical Kronstadt sailors – who had tried and executed many officers, including one admiral – further fueled the growing revolutionary atmosphere. Sailors and soldiers, along with Petrograd workers, took to the streets in violent protest, calling for "all power to the Soviets". The revolt, however, was disowned by Lenin and the Bolshevik leaders and dissipated within a few days. In the aftermath, Lenin fled to Finland under threat of arrest while Trotsky, among other prominent Bolsheviks, was arrested. The July Days confirmed the popularity of the anti-war, radical Bolsheviks, but their unpreparedness at the moment of revolt was an embarrassing gaffe that lost them support among their main constituent groups: soldiers and workers.

The Bolshevik failure in the July Days proved temporary. The Bolsheviks had undergone a spectacular growth in membership. Whereas, in February 1917, the Bolsheviks were limited to only 24,000 members, by September 1917 there were 200,000 members of the Bolshevik faction.  Previously, the Bolsheviks had been in the minority in the two leading cities of Russia—St. Petersburg and Moscow behind the Mensheviks and the Socialist Revolutionaries, by September the Bolsheviks were in the majority in both cities.  Furthermore, the Bolshevik-controlled Moscow Regional Bureau of the Party also controlled the Party organizations of the 13 provinces around Moscow. These 13 provinces held 37% of Russia's population and 20% of the membership of the Bolshevik faction.

In August, poor and misleading communication led General Lavr Kornilov, the recently appointed Supreme Commander of Russian military forces, to believe that the Petrograd government had already been captured by radicals, or was in serious danger thereof. In response, he ordered troops to Petrograd to pacify the city.  To secure his position, Kerensky had to ask for Bolshevik assistance. He also sought help from the Petrograd Soviet, which called upon armed Red Guards to "defend the revolution". The Kornilov Affair failed largely due to the efforts of the Bolsheviks, whose influence over railroad and telegraph workers proved vital in stopping the movement of troops. With his coup failing, Kornilov surrendered and was relieved of his position. The Bolsheviks' role in stopping the attempted coup further strengthened their position.

In early September, the Petrograd Soviet freed all jailed Bolsheviks and Trotsky became chairman of the Petrograd Soviet. Growing numbers of socialists and lower-class Russians viewed the government less as a force in support of their needs and interests. The Bolsheviks benefited as the only major organized opposition party that had refused to compromise with the Provisional Government, and they benefited from growing frustration and even disgust with other parties, such as the Mensheviks and Socialist Revolutionaries, who stubbornly refused to break with the idea of national unity across all classes.

In Finland, Lenin had worked on his book State and Revolution and continued to lead his party, writing newspaper articles and policy decrees. By October, he returned to Petrograd (present-day St. Petersburg), aware that the increasingly radical city presented him no legal danger and a second opportunity for revolution. Recognising the strength of the Bolsheviks, Lenin began pressing for the immediate overthrow of the Kerensky government by the Bolsheviks. Lenin was of the opinion that taking power should occur in both St. Petersburg and Moscow simultaneously, parenthetically stating that it made no difference which city rose up first, but expressing his opinion that Moscow may well rise up first.  The Bolshevik Central Committee drafted a resolution, calling for the dissolution of the Provisional Government in favor of the Petrograd Soviet.  The resolution was passed 10–2 (Lev Kamenev and Grigory Zinoviev prominently dissenting) promoting the October Revolution.

October Revolution

The October Revolution, night to Wednesday 7 November 1917 according to the modern Gregorian calendar and night to Wednesday 25 October according to the Julian calendar at the time in tsarist Russia, was organized by the Bolshevik party. Lenin did not have any direct role in the revolution and due to his personal security he was hiding. The Revolutionary Military Committee established by the Bolshevik party was organizing the insurrection and Leon Trotsky was the chairman. However, Lenin played a crucial role in the debate in the leadership of the Bolshevik party for a revolutionary insurrection as the party in the autumn of 1917 received a majority in the soviets. An ally in the left fraction of the Revolutionary-Socialist Party, with huge support among the peasants who opposed Russia's participation in the war, supported the slogan 'All power to the Soviets'.

Liberal and monarchist forces, loosely organized into the White Army, immediately went to war against the Bolsheviks' Red Army, in a series of battles that would become known as the Russian Civil War. This did not happen in 1917. The Civil War began in early 1918 with domestic anti-Bolshevik forces confronting the nascent Red Army.  In autumn of 1918 Allied countries needed to block German access to Russian supplies. They sent troops to support the "Whites" with supplies of weapons, ammunition and logistic equipment being sent from the main Western countries but this was not at all coordinated. Germany did not participate in the civil war as it surrendered to the Allied.

The provisional government with its second and third coalition was led by a right wing fraction of the Socialist-Revolutionary party, SR. This non-elected provisional government faced the revolutionary situation and the growing mood against the war by avoiding elections to the state Duma. However, the October revolution forced the political parties behind the newly dissolved provisional government to move and move fast for immediate elections. All happened so fast that the left SR fraction did not have time to reach out and be represented in ballots of the SR party which was part of the coalition in the provisional government. This non-elected government supported continuation of the war on the side of the allied forces. The elections to the State Duma 25 November 1917 therefore did not mirror the true political situation among peasants even if we don't know how the outcome would be if the anti-war left SR fraction had a fair chance to challenge the party leaders. In the elections the Bolshevik party received 25% of the votes and the Socialist-Revolutionaries as much as 58%. It is possible the left SR had a good chance to reach more than 25% of the votes and thereby legitimate the October revolution but we can only guess.

Lenin did not believe that a socialist revolution necessarily presupposed a fully developed capitalist economy. A semi-capitalist country would suffice and Russia had a working class base of 5% of the population.

Though Lenin was the leader of the Bolshevik Party, it has been argued that since Lenin was not present during the actual takeover of the Winter Palace, it was really Trotsky's organization and direction that led the revolution, merely spurred by the motivation Lenin instigated within his party. Critics on the Right have long argued that the financial and logistical assistance of German intelligence via their key agent, Alexander Parvus was a key component as well, though historians are divided, since there is little evidence supporting that claim.

Soviet membership was initially freely elected, but many members of the Socialist Revolutionary Party, anarchists, and other leftists created opposition to the Bolsheviks through the Soviets themselves. The elections to the Russian Constituent Assembly took place 25 November 1917. The Bolsheviks gained 25% of the vote. When it became clear that the Bolsheviks had little support outside of the industrialized areas of Saint Petersburg and Moscow, they simply barred non-Bolsheviks from membership in the Soviets. The Bolsheviks dissolved the Constituent Assembly in January 1918.

Russian Civil War 

The Russian Civil War, which broke out in 1918 shortly after the October Revolution, resulted in the deaths and suffering of millions of people regardless of their political orientation. The war was fought mainly between the Red Army ("Reds"), consisting of the uprising majority led by the Bolshevik minority, and the "Whites" – army officers and cossacks, the "bourgeoisie", and political groups ranging from the far Right, to the Socialist Revolutionaries who opposed the drastic restructuring championed by the Bolsheviks following the collapse of the Provisional Government, to the Soviets (under clear Bolshevik dominance). The Whites had backing from other countries such as the United Kingdom, France, the United States, and Japan, while the Reds possessed internal support, proving to be much more effective. Though the Allied nations, using external interference, provided substantial military aid to the loosely knit anti-Bolshevik forces, they were ultimately defeated.

The Bolsheviks firstly assumed power in Petrograd, expanding their rule outwards. They eventually reached the Easterly Siberian Russian coast in Vladivostok, four years after the war began, an occupation that is believed to have ended all significant military campaigns in the nation. Less than one year later, the last area controlled by the White Army, the Ayano-Maysky District, directly to the north of the Krai containing Vladivostok, was given up when General Anatoly Pepelyayev capitulated in 1923.

Several revolts were initiated against the Bolsheviks and their army near the end of the war, notably the Kronstadt Rebellion. This was a naval mutiny engineered by Soviet Baltic sailors, former Red Army soldiers, and the people of Kronstadt. This armed uprising was fought against the antagonizing Bolshevik economic policies that farmers were subjected to, including seizures of grain crops by the Communists. This all amounted to large-scale discontent. When delegates representing the Kronstadt sailors arrived at Petrograd for negotiations, they raised 15 demands primarily pertaining to the Russian right to freedom. The Government firmly denounced the rebellions and labelled the requests as a reminder of the Social Revolutionaries, a political party that was popular among Soviets before Lenin, but refused to cooperate with the Bolshevik Army. The Government then responded with an armed suppression of these revolts and suffered ten thousand casualties before entering the city of Kronstadt. This ended the rebellions fairly quickly, causing many of the rebels to flee seeking political exile.

During the Civil War, Nestor Makhno led a Ukrainian anarchist movement. Makhno's Insurgent Army allied to the Bolsheviks thrice, with one of the powers ending the alliance each time. However, a Bolshevik force under Mikhail Frunze destroyed the Makhnovshchina, when the Makhnovists refused to merge into the Red Army. In addition, the so-called "Green Army" (peasants defending their property against the opposing forces) played a secondary role in the war, mainly in Ukraine.

Revolutionary tribunals 
Revolutionary tribunals were present during both the Revolution and the Civil War, intended for the purpose of combatting forces of counter-revolution. At the Civil War's zenith, it is reported that upwards of 200,000 cases were investigated by approximately 200 tribunals. These tribunals established themselves more so from the Cheka as a more moderate force that acted under the banner of revolutionary justice, rather than a utilizer of strict brute force as the former did. However, these tribunals did come with their own set of inefficiencies, such as responding to cases in a matter of months and not having a concrete definition of "counter-revolution" that was determined on a case-by-case basis. The "Decree on Revolutionary Tribunals" used by the People's Commissar of Justice, states in article 2 that "In fixing the penalty, the Revolutionary Tribunal shall be guided by the circumstances of the case and the dictates of the revolutionary conscience." Revolutionary tribunals ultimately demonstrated that a form of justice was still prevalent in Russian society where the Russian Provisional Government failed. This, in part, triggered the political transition of the October Revolution and the Civil War that followed in its aftermath.

Execution of the imperial family

The Bolsheviks executed the Tsar and his family on 16 July 1918. But in August 1917, they evacuated the Romanovs to Tobolsk in the Urals to protect them from the rising tide of revolution. After the Bolsheviks came to power in October 1917, the conditions of their imprisonment grew stricter and talk of putting Nicholas on trial increased. In April and May 1918, the looming civil war led the Bolsheviks to move the family to the stronghold of Yekaterinburg.

During the early morning of 16 July, Nicholas, Alexandra, their children, their physician, and several servants were taken into the basement and shot. According to Edvard Radzinsky and Dmitrii Volkogonov, the order came directly from Lenin and Yakov Sverdlov in Moscow. However this claim has never been confirmed. The execution may have been carried out on the initiative of local Bolshevik officials, or it may have been an option pre-approved in Moscow as White troops were rapidly approaching Yekaterinburg. Radzinsky noted that Lenin's bodyguard personally delivered the telegram ordering the execution and that he was ordered to destroy the evidence.

Symbolism 

The Russian Revolution became the site for many instances of symbolism, both physical and non-physical. Communist symbolism is perhaps the most notable of this time period, such as the debut of the iconic hammer and sickle as a representation of the October Revolution in 1917, eventually becoming the official symbol of the USSR in 1924, and later the symbol of Communism as a whole. Although the Bolsheviks did not have extensive political experience, their portrayal of the revolution itself as both a political and symbolic order resulted in Communism's portrayal as a messianic faith, formally known as communist messianism. Portrayals of notable revolutionary figures such as Lenin were done in iconographic methods, equating them similarly to religious figures, though religion itself was banned in the USSR and groups such as the Russian Orthodox Church were persecuted.

The revolution and the world

The revolution ultimately led to the establishment of the future Soviet Union as an ideocracy; however, the establishment of such a state came as an ideological paradox, as Marx's ideals of how a socialist state ought to be created were based on the formation being natural and not artificially incited (i.e. by means of revolution). Leon Trotsky said that the goal of socialism in Russia would not be realized without the success of the world revolution. A revolutionary wave caused by the Russian Revolution lasted until 1923, but despite initial hopes for success in the German Revolution of 1918–19, the short-lived Hungarian Soviet Republic, and others like it, no other Marxist movement at the time succeeded in keeping power in its hands.

This issue is subject to conflicting views on communist history by various Marxist groups and parties. Joseph Stalin later rejected this idea, stating that socialism was possible in one country.

The confusion regarding Stalin's position on the issue stems from the fact that, after Lenin's death in 1924, he successfully used Lenin's argument – the argument that socialism's success needs the support of workers of other countries in order to happen – to defeat his competitors within the party by accusing them of betraying Lenin and, therefore, the ideals of the October Revolution.

Historiography

Few events in historical research have been as conditioned by political influences as the October Revolution. The historiography of the Revolution generally divides into three schools of thought: the Soviet-Marxist view, the Western Totalitarian view, and the Revisionist (Trotskyist) view. Since the fall of Communism (and the USSR) in Russia in 1991, the Western-Totalitarian view has again become dominant and the Soviet-Marxist view has practically vanished in mainstream political analysis.

Following the death of Vladimir Lenin, the Bolshevik government was thrown into a crisis. Lenin failed to designate who his successor would be or how they would be chosen. A power struggle broke out in the party between Leon Trotsky and his enemies. Trotsky was defeated by the anti-Trotsky bloc by the mid 1920s and his hopes for party leadership was dashed. Among Trotsky's opponents, Joseph Stalin would rise to assume unchallenged party leadership by 1928. In 1927 Trotsky was expelled from the party and in 1929 he lost his citizenship and was sent into exile. While in exile he began honing his own interpretation of Marxism called Trotskyism. The schism between Trotsky and Stalin is the focal point where the Revisionist view comes into existence. Trotsky traveled across the world denouncing Stalin and the Soviet Union under his leadership. He specifically focused his criticism on Stalin's doctrine, Socialism in One Country, claiming that it was incongruent with the ideology of the revolution. Eventually, Trotsky settled in Mexico City and began a base of operations for him and his supporters. In 1937 at the height of the Great Purge, he published the Revolution Betrayed which outlined his ideological contradictions with Stalin, and how Stalin was guilty of subverting and debasing the 1917 revolution. He continued to vocally criticize Stalin and Stalinism until his assassination in 1940 on Stalin's orders.

The Soviet-Marxist interpretation is the belief that the Russian Revolution under the Bolsheviks was a proud and glorious effort of the working class which saw the removal of the Tsar, nobility, and capitalists from positions of power. The Bolsheviks and later the Communist Party took the first steps in liberating the proletariat and building a workers' state that practiced equality. Outside of Eastern Europe this view was heavily criticized as following the death of Lenin the Soviet Union became more authoritarian. Even though the Soviet Union no longer exists, the Soviet-Marxist view is still interpreted in academia today. Both academics and Soviet supporters acknowledge this view is bolstered by several key events. First, the RSFSR made substantial advancements to women's' rights. It was the first country to decriminalize abortion and allowed women to be educated, which was forbidden under the Tsar. Furthermore, the RSFSR decriminalized homosexuality between consenting adults which was seen as radical for the time period. The Bolshevik government also actively recruited working class citizens into positions of party leadership, thereby ensuring the proletariat had a voice in policymaking. One of the most important aspects to this view was the Bolshevik victory in the Russian Civil War. On paper, the Bolsheviks should have been defeated in part due to the broad international support their enemies were receiving. Britain, France, the United States, Japan, and other countries sent aid to the White Army and expedition forces against the Bolsheviks. The Bolsheviks were further at a disadvantage due to factors such as: the small land area under their control, lack of professional officers, and supply shortages. In spite of this, the Red Army prevailed. The Red Army unlike many White factions maintained a high morale among their troops and civilians throughout the duration of the civil war. This was in part due to their skillful use propaganda. Bolshevik propaganda portrayed the Red Army as liberators and stewards of the poor and downtrodden. Bolshevik support was further elevated by Lenin's initiatives to distribute land to the peasantry, and ending the war with Germany. During the civil war, the Bolsheviks were able to raise an army numbering around 5 million active soldiers. Domestic support and patriotism played a decisive role in the Russian Civil War. By 1923 the Bolsheviks had controlled the last of the White Army holdouts and the Russian Civil War concluded with a Bolshevik victory. This victory ultimately influenced how the Soviet Union interpreted its own ideology and the October Revolution itself. Starting in 1919, the Soviets would commemorate the event with a military parade and a public holiday. This tradition lasted up until the collapse of the Soviet Union. As time went on the Soviet-Marxist interpretation evolved with an "anti-Stalinist" version of it. This subsection attempts to draw a distinction between the "Lenin period" (1917–24) and the "Stalin period" (1928–53). 

Views from the west were mixed. Socialists and labor organizations tended to support the October Revolution and the Bolshevik seizure of power. On the other hand, western governments were mortified.  Western leaders, and later some academics concluded that the Russian Revolution only replaced one form of tyranny, (Tsarism) with another (communism).  Initially, the Bolsheviks were tolerant of opposing political factions. Upon seizing state power, they organized a parliament, the Russian Constituent Assembly. On November 25, an election was held. Despite the Bolsheviks being the party that overthrew the Provisional Government and organizing the assembly, they lost the election. Rather than govern as a coalition, the Bolsheviks banned all political opposition. Historians point to this as the start of communist authoritarianism.  Conservative historian, Robert Service, states, "he (Lenin) aided the foundations of dictatorship and lawlessness. He had consolidated the principle of state penetration of the whole society, its economy and its culture. Lenin had practiced terror and advocated revolutionary amoralism." Lenin allowed for certain disagreement and debate but only within the highest organs of the Bolshevik party, and practicing democratic centralism. The RSFSR and later the Soviet Union continued to practice political repression until its dissolution in 1991.

Cultural portrayal

Literature 
 The White Guard by Mikhail Bulgakov, 1925. Partially autobiographical novel, portraying the life of one family torn apart by uncertainty of the Civil War times.
 The Life of Klim Samgin (1927–1931) by Maxim Gorky. A novel that portrays the decline of Russian intelligentsia from the start of the 1870s and the assassination of Alexander II to the Revolution.
 Mikhail Sholokhov's novel Quiet Flows the Don (1928–1940) describes the lives of Don Cossacks during the World War I, the Revolution, and the Civil War. 
 George Orwell's classic novella Animal Farm (1945) is an allegory of the Russian Revolution and its aftermath. It describes the dictator Joseph Stalin as a big Berkshire boar named, "Napoleon". Trotsky is represented by a pig called Snowball who is a brilliant talker and makes magnificent speeches. However, Napoleon overthrows Snowball as Stalin overthrew Trotsky and Napoleon takes over the farm the animals live on. Napoleon becomes a tyrant and uses force and propaganda to oppress the animals, while culturally teaching them that they are free.
 Doctor Zhivago (1957) by Boris Pasternak describes the fate of Russian intelligentsia; the events take place between the Revolution of 1905 and World War II.
 The Red Wheel (1984–1991) by Aleksandr Solzhenitsyn. A cycle of novels that describes the fall of the Russian Empire and the establishment of the Soviet Union.

Film
The Russian Revolution has been portrayed in or served as backdrop for many films. Among them, in order of release date:

 The End of Saint Petersburg. 1927. Directed by Vsevolod Pudovkin and Mikhail Doller, USSR.
 October: Ten Days That Shook the World. 1927. Directed by Sergei Eisenstein and Grigori Aleksandrov. Soviet Union. Black and White. Silent.
 Scarlet Dawn, a 1932 Pre-Code American romantic drama starring Douglas Fairbanks, Jr. and Nancy Carroll caught up in the fallout of the Russian Revolution.
 Knight Without Armour. 1937.  A British historical drama starring Marlene Dietrich and Robert Donat, with Dietrich as an imperiled aristocrat on the eve of the Russian Revolution.
 Lenin in 1918. 1939. Directed by Mikhail Romm, E. Aron, and I. Simkov.  Historical-revolutionary film about Lenin's activities in the first years of Soviet power.
 Doctor Zhivago. 1965. A drama-romance-war film directed by David Lean, filmed in Europe with a largely European cast, loosely based on the famous novel of the same name by Boris Pasternak.
 Reds. 1981. Directed by Warren Beatty, it is based on the book Ten Days that Shook the World.
 Anastasia. 1997. An American animated feature, directed by Don Bluth and Gary Goldman.

See also

 Index of articles related to the Russian Revolution and Civil War
 April Crisis
 Foreign relations of the Soviet Union
 Arthur Ransome
 Paris Commune
 Preference falsification
 Ten Days That Shook the World

Explanatory footnotes

References

Further reading

 Acton, Edward, Vladimir Cherniaev, and William G. Rosenberg, eds. A Critical Companion to the Russian Revolution, 1914–1921 (Bloomington, 1997).
 Ascher, Abraham. The Russian Revolution: A Beginner's Guide (Oneworld Publications, 2014)
 
 Brenton, Tony. Was Revolution Inevitable?: Turning Points of the Russian Revolution (Oxford UP, 2017).
 Cambridge History of Russia, vol. 2–3, Cambridge University Press.  (vol. 2)  (vol. 3).
 Chamberlin, William Henry. The Russian Revolution, Volume I: 1917–1918: From the Overthrow of the Tsar to the Assumption of Power by the Bolsheviks;  The Russian Revolution, Volume II: 1918–1921: From the Civil War to the Consolidation of Power (1935), famous classic online
  online
 Daly, Jonathan and Leonid Trofimov, eds. "Russia in War and Revolution, 1914–1922: A Documentary History." (Indianapolis and Cambridge, MA: Hackett Publishing Company, 2009). .
 Fitzpatrick, Sheila. The Russian Revolution. 199 pages. Oxford University Press; (2nd ed. 2001). .
 Hasegawa, Tsuyoshi. The February Revolution, Petrograd, 1917: The End of the Tsarist Regime and the Birth of Dual Power (Brill, 2017).
 Lincoln, W. Bruce. Passage Through Armageddon: The Russians in War and Revolution, 1914–1918. (New York, 1986).
 
 Marples, David R. Lenin's Revolution: Russia, 1917–1921 (Routledge, 2014).
 Mawdsley, Evan. Russian Civil War (2007). 400p.
 Palat, Madhavan K., Social Identities in Revolutionary Russia, ed. (Macmillan, Palgrave, UK, and St Martin's Press, New York, 2001).
 Piper, Jessica. Events That Changed the Course of History: The Story of the Russian Revolution 100 Years Later (Atlantic Publishing Company, 2017).\

 Pipes, Richard. The Russian Revolution (New York, 1990) online
 
 Pipes, Richard. A concise history of the Russian Revolution (1995) online
 Rabinowitch, Alexander. The Bolsheviks in power: the first year of Soviet rule in Petrograd (Indiana UP, 2008). online; also audio version
 Rappaport, Helen. Caught in the Revolution: Petrograd, Russia, 1917–A World on the Edge (Macmillan, 2017).
 Riasanovsky, Nicholas V. and Mark D. Steinberg A History of Russia (7th ed.) (Oxford University Press 2005).
 Rubenstein, Joshua. (2013) Leon Trotsky: A Revolutionary's Life (2013) excerpt
 Service, Robert (2005). Stalin: A Biography. Cambridge: Belknap Press.  online
 Service, Robert. Lenin: A Biography (2000); one vol edition of his three volume scholarly biography online
 
 
 Harold Shukman, ed. The Blackwell Encyclopedia of the Russian Revolution (1998) articles by over 40 specialists online
 Smele, Jonathan. The 'Russian' Civil Wars, 1916–1926: Ten Years That Shook the World (Oxford UP, 2016).
 Steinberg, Mark. The Russian Revolution, 1905-1921 (Oxford UP, 2017). audio version
 Stoff, Laurie S. They Fought for the Motherland: Russia's Women Soldiers in World War I & the Revolution (2006) 294pp
 Swain, Geoffrey. Trotsky and the Russian Revolution (Routledge, 2014)
 
 
 White, James D. Lenin: The Practice & Theory of Revolution (2001) 262pp
 Wolfe, Bertram D. (1948) Three Who Made a Revolution: A Biographical History of Lenin, Trotsky, and Stalin (1948)  online free to borrow

Historiography
 Gatrell, Peter. "Tsarist Russia at War: The View from Above, 1914–February 1917"  Journal of Modern History 87#4 (2015)  668-700 online
 Haynes, Mike and Jim Wolfreys, (eds). History and Revolution: Refuting Revisionism. Verso Books, 2007. 
 Lyandres, Semion, and Andrei Borisovich Nikolaev. "Contemporary Russian Scholarship on the February Revolution in Petrograd: Some Centenary Observations." Revolutionary Russia 30.2 (2017): 158-181.
 Smith, S. A. "The historiography of the Russian revolution 100 years on." Kritika: Explorations in Russian and Eurasian History 16.4 (2015): 733–749.
 Smith, Steve. "Writing the History of the Russian Revolution after the Fall of Communism." Europe‐Asia Studies 46.4 (1994): 563–578.
 Suny, Ronald Grigor, ed. Red Flag Unfurled: History, Historians, and the Russian Revolution (New York: Verso, 2017)  excerpt
 Tereshchuk,  Andrei V.  "The Last Autocrat Reassessing Nicholas II" Russian Studies in History 50#4 (2012)  pp. 3–6.  DOI 10.2753/RSH1061-1983500400
 
 Wade, Rex A. "The Revolution at One Hundred: Issues and Trends in the English Language Historiography of the Russian Revolution of 1917." Journal of Modern Russian History and Historiography 9.1 (2016): 9–38.
 Warth, Robert D. "On the Historiography of the Russian Revolution." Slavic Review 26.2 (1967): 247–264.

Participants' accounts
 Reed, John. Ten Days that Shook the World. 1919, 1st Edition, published by BONI & Liveright, Inc. for International Publishers. Transcribed and marked by David Walters for John Reed Internet Archive. Penguin Books; 1st edition. 1 June 1980. . Retrieved 14 May 2005.
 Serge, Victor. Year One of the Russian Revolution. L'An l de la revolution russe, 1930. Year One of the Russian Revolution, Holt, Rinehart, and Winston. Translation, editor's Introduction, and notes © 1972 by Peter Sedgwick. Reprinted on Victor Serge Internet Archive by permission. . Retrieved 14 May 2005.
 Steinberg, Mark, Voices of Revolution, 1917. Yale University Press, 2001
 Trotsky, Leon. The History of the Russian Revolution. Translated by Max Eastman, 1932.  .

Primary sources
 Ascher, Abraham, ed. The Mensheviks in the Russian Revolution (Ithaca, 1976).
 Browder, Robert Paul and Alexander F. Kerensky, eds., The Russian Provisional Government, 1917: Documents. 3 volumes (Stanford, 1961).
 Bunyan, James and H. H. Fisher, eds. The Bolshevik Revolution, 1917–1918: Documents and Materials (Stanford, 1961; first ed. 1934).
 Daly, Jonathan and Leonid Trofimov, eds. "Russia in War and Revolution, 1914-1922: A Documentary History." (Indianapolis and Cambridge, MA: Hackett Publishing Company, 2009). . Includes private letters, press editorials, government decrees, diaries, philosophical tracts, belles-lettres, and memoirs; 416pp.
 Golder, Frank Alfred. Documents Of Russian History 1914-1917 (1927), 680pp online
 Miller, Martin A., ed. Russian Revolution: The Essential Readings (2001) 304pp
 Steinberg, Mark D. Voices of Revolution, 1917. In the series "Annals of Communism," Yale University Press, 2001. 404pp On-line publication of these texts in the Russian original: Golosa revoliutsii, 1917 g. (Yale University Press, 2002)
 Zeman, Z. A. B. ed. Germany and the Revolution in Russia, 1915–1918: Documents from the Archives of the German Foreign Ministry (1958)

External links
 
 Read, Christopher: Revolutions (Russian Empire), in: 1914-1918-online. International Encyclopedia of the First World War.
 Brudek, Paweł: Revolutions (East Central Europe), in: 1914-1918-online. International Encyclopedia of the First World War.
 Sumpf, Alexandre: Russian Civil War, in: 1914-1918-online. International Encyclopedia of the First World War.
 Mawdsley, Evan: International Responses to the Russian Civil War (Russian Empire), in: 1914-1918-online. International Encyclopedia of the First World War.
 Melancon, Michael S.: Social Conflict and Control, Protest and Repression (Russian Empire), in: 1914-1918-online. International Encyclopedia of the First World War.
 Sanborn, Joshua A.: Russian Empire, in: 1914-1918-online. International Encyclopedia of the First World War.
 Gaida, Fedor Aleksandrovich: Governments, Parliaments and Parties (Russian Empire), in: 1914-1918-online. International Encyclopedia of the First World War.
 Albert, Gleb: Labour Movements, Trade Unions and Strikes (Russian Empire), in: 1914-1918-online. International Encyclopedia of the First World War.
 Gatrell, Peter: Organization of War Economies (Russian Empire), in: 1914-1918-online. International Encyclopedia of the First World War.
 Marks, Steven G.: War Finance (Russian Empire), in: 1914-1918-online. International Encyclopedia of the First World War.
 Orlando Figes's free educational website on the Russian Revolution and Soviet history, May 2014
 Soviet history archive at www.marxists.org
 Archival footage of the Russian Revolution // Net-Film Newsreels and Documentary Films Archive
 Précis of Russian Revolution A summary of the key events and factors of the 1917 Russian Revolution.
 Kevin Murphy's Isaac and Tamara Deutscher Memorial Prize lecture Can we Write the History of the Russian Revolution, which examines historical accounts of 1917 in the light of newly accessible archive material.
 Thanks to Trotsky, the 'insurrection' was bloodless
 Violence and Revolution in 1917. Mike Haynes for Jacobin. 17 July 2017.
 The Bolsheviks and workers' control: the state and counter-revolution - Maurice Brinton

 
Revolution
20th-century revolutions
Aftermath of World War I in Russia and in the Soviet Union
Communism in Russia
Communist revolutions
Russian Revolution
Rebellions against the Russian Empire
Revolutions in the Russian Empire